David H. Warren is an academic administrator and educator. He served as the acting chancellor at the  University of California, Riverside from March, 2002 through July 2002. He bridged the tenures of Raymond L. Orbach and France Córdova.

Warren is a professor emeritus in the Department of Psychology at UCR. He also served as the dean of the College of Humanities, Arts and Social Sciences and the chair of the department of psychology.

Education
He earned his degree from Yale in 1965, then completed his Ph.D. in child development from the University of Minnesota.

References

Chancellors of the University of California, Riverside
University of Minnesota College of Education and Human Development alumni
Yale University alumni
Living people
Year of birth missing (living people)